Fires of Fate is a 1923 British-American silent adventure film directed by Tom Terriss and starring Wanda Hawley, Nigel Barrie and Pedro de Cordoba. It was adapted from the 1909 play Fires of Fate by Arthur Conan Doyle which was in turn based on his 1898 novel The Tragedy of the Korosko. The version released in the United States is known as Desert Sheik.

Cast
 Wanda Hawley as Dorinne Adams 
 Nigel Barrie as Col. Egerton 
 Pedro de Cordoba as Prince Ibrahim 
 Stewart Rome as Rev. Samuel Rodin 
 Edith Craig as Miss Adams 
 Percy Standing as Stephen Belmont 
 Arthur M. Cullin as Sir Charles Rodin 
 Douglas Munro as Mansoor 
 Cyril Smith as Lord Howard Cecil

References

External links

1923 films
1924 adventure films
1924 films
British adventure films
American adventure films
1920s English-language films
Films directed by Tom Terriss
Films based on works by Arthur Conan Doyle
Films set in Egypt
British films based on plays
American films based on plays
Films based on British novels
British silent feature films
American silent feature films
British black-and-white films
American black-and-white films
Films based on adaptations
Silent adventure films
1920s American films
1920s British films